Bioenergy Corporation (Russian: Корпорация "Биоэнергия") is industrial holding company in the field of fuel energy, engineering and biotechnology. Assets of the company provide a  production cycle for Industrial Engineering, peat extraction and processing, production and distribution of finished products, generating heat and electricity.

The basis for holding a number of technology clusters in the peat industry. The main production assets are concentrated in the Central European part of Russia. In particular, a corporation controlled by one of the largest peat Russian companies LLC "Mokeiha-Zybinskoe" in the Yaroslavl region of Russia and "Vladimir-Peat"  in Vladimir region.

Gallery

Management

 Chairman of the Board of Directors is David Yakobashvili.
 President, Member of the Board is Yan Yanovskiy.

References

External links 
 "Биоэнергия" намерена развивать торфяную энергетику // МОСКВА, 22 сен - РИА Новости
 Корпорация «Биоэнергия» объявляет о покупке крупного производственного актива // Частный корреспондент, 21 сентября 2011 года
 "Биоэнергия" в 2011 г инвестирует 204 млн руб в добычу и переработку торфа во Владимирской области
 Ольга Лаврова. Корпорация «Биоэнергия» заинтересовалась новгородским торфом
 Анна ДЕКТЯРЕВА. Добыча торфа в Мещере спасет нас от пожаров? // Комсомольская правда
 Всеволод ШАПОШНИКОВ. В Ярославской области создается кластер производства биотоплива // Комсомольская правда
 140 млн. рублей инвестировано в развитие торфяной отрасли Владимирской области

Mining companies of Russia
Energy companies established in 2011
Non-renewable resource companies established in 2011
Companies based in Moscow